The Mancomunidad de la Comarca de Pamplona is a community of municipalities of the Pamplona metropolitan area, whose functions are water supply and sewage treatment, waste management, metropolitan public transportation, taxi and the Arga metropolitan park.

Historically, it was born as Mancomunidad de Aguas de la Comarca de Pamplona in 1982 in order to provide water services. It changed its name when the entity began to manage waste in 1987. Later, it assumed the management of public transportation (1999) and taxi (2006).

Municipalities
Adiós
Antsoain / Ansoáin
Anue
Añorbe
Aranguren
Atetz / Atez
Barañain
Basaburua
Belaskoain / Belascoáin
Beriain / Beriáin
Berriobeiti / Berrioplano
Berriozar
Biurrun-Olkotz / Biurrun-Olcoz
Burlata / Burlada
Oltza Zendea / Cendea de Olza
Ziritza / Ciriza
Zizur Zendea / Cendea de Cizur
Etxarri / Echarri
Eguesibar / Egüés
Eneritz / Enériz
Esteríbar
Etxauri
Ezkabarte / Ezcabarte
Galar
Goñi
Girgillao / Guirguillano
Huarte / Uharte
Getze Ibargoiti / Salinas de Ibargoiti
Imotz
Itza / Iza
Txulapain / Juslapeña
Lantz
Legarda
Monreal
Muruzabal
Noain (Elortzibar) / Noáin (Valle de Elorz)
Odieta
Oláibar
Ollaran / Valle de Ollo
Orkoien / Orcoyen
Pamplona-Iruña
Tiebas-Muruarte de Reta
Tirapu
Ukar / Úcar
Ultzama
Uterga
Vidaurreta
Atarrabia / Villava
Zabltza / Zabalza
Zizur Nagusia / Zizur Mayor

See also
Cuenca de Pamplona

External links
 Mancomunidad de la Comarca de Pamplona web

Comarcas of Navarre
Pamplona